Korsaranthus natalensis, commonly known as the spinnaker anemone or the candy-striped anemone, is a species of sea anemone in the family Actiniidae. It is the only member of its genus.

Description
The spinnaker anemone is a medium-sized anemone of up to 10 cm in diameter. It is a vividly coloured red and white striped anemone. Its column has fine striping. It has about 50 broadly striped tentacles. Red and pink lines radiate outwards from its mouth. It has a walking disc which is red with white striping.

Distribution
The spinnaker anemone is endemic to the South African coast, where it is found from False Bay to Durban. It inhabits waters from 10 m to at least 30 m in depth.

Ecology
This is a rare anemone. It is mobile and may be observed, when not attached to the reef, using its parachute-like walking disc to sail to new locations. It preys on octocorals.

References

Actiniidae

Animals described in 1938